One Small Step: The Story of the Space Chimps is a 2008 documentary film produced and directed by David Cassidy and Kristin Davy which aired on History Channel UK and CBC Television. The film chronicles the real story behind the early use of chimpanzees in space exploration. The film was released on DVD in April 2008, after several delays. Cassidy is best known for co-producing the 2006 documentary Shut Up and Sing on the Dixie Chicks.

Release
One Small Step: The Story of the Space Chimps is a documentary that screened in over 20 film festivals including the Maryland Film Festival, the Vancouver International Film Festival, and the Hot Springs Documentary Film Festival, before airing on television and being released on DVD.

Plot
Told through archival photos and footage, space historians, testimony from the chimpanzees' trainers, and through the people who fought for the space chimpanzees' peaceful retirement, the film explores the compelling journey of the United States Air Force space from their primate predecessors and early rocket tests to Ham and Enos as they made their ground breaking missions into space.

The story reveals the space chimpanzees' triumphs and tragedies and brings to light the virtually unknown account of how the colony was rewarded for their long and challenging service to NASA, the Air Force, and the United States.

Featured in the documentary are interviews with Dr. Carole Noon who heads up the Save the Chimps sanctuary, Dr. Jane Goodall, and archival footage of President John F. Kennedy's famous 1962 space exploration speech "We choose to go to the Moon". The film also recounts the stories of many early primate missions including those of Able and Baker, and Gordo.

References

External links
 
 One Small Step: The Story of the Space Chimps Official Documentary Site
 28, 2003/chimps-0322.html Review of Space Chimps Documentary

American documentary films
Animals in space
2008 documentary films
2008 films
Documentary films about the space program of the United States
Films about apes
2000s American films